The Best of Plumb is a compilation album by Christian singer Plumb which features 15 previously released songs, including three remixes.

Track listing
 "Here With Me"
 "Sobering"
 "Stranded"
 "Endure"
 "Late Great Planet Earth"
 "Who Am I?"
 "Phobic"
 "Crazy"
 "Damaged"
 "Concrete"
 "God-Shaped Hole"
 "Pennyless"
 "Endure" (Remix)
 "Who Am I?" (Remix)
 "Crazy" (Remix)

References

2000 greatest hits albums
Plumb (singer) compilation albums
Essential Records (Christian) compilation albums